HDMS Indfødsretten may refer to:

 HDMS Indfødsretten (1776), Danish ship of the line launched in 1776
 HDMS Indfødsretten (1786), Danish ship of the line launched in 1786

References

Royal Danish Navy ship names